Murray Dennis Davison (June 10, 1938 – January 13, 2000) was a Canadian professional ice hockey defenceman who played in one National Hockey League game for the Boston Bruins during the 1965–66 season. After this, Murray spent six seasons with the Blazers, four of which he served as a player/coach. After suiting up for just one game with Oklahoma City in 1970-71, Davison retired as a player.

Career statistics

Regular season and playoffs

See also
List of players who played only one game in the NHL

References

External links

1938 births
2000 deaths
Barrie Flyers players
Boston Bruins players
Canadian expatriate ice hockey players in the United States
Canadian ice hockey defencemen
Cleveland Barons (1937–1973) players
Greensboro Generals (EHL) players
Ice hockey people from Ontario
Oklahoma City Blazers (1965–1977) players
Ontario Hockey Association Senior A League (1890–1979) players
Quebec Aces (QSHL) players
Springfield Indians players
Sportspeople from Brantford